The First Brandt cabinet was the government of Germany between 22 October 1969 and 15 December 1972, during the 6th legislature of the Bundestag. Led by the Social Democrat Willy Brandt, the cabinet was a coalition between the Social Democrats (SPD) and the Free Democratic Party (FDP). The Vice-Chancellor was the Free Democrat Walter Scheel (FDP).

Composition 

|}

See also 
 Cabinet of Germany
 Cabinet Brandt II

References

Brandt I
Brandt I
1969 establishments in West Germany
1972 disestablishments in West Germany
Cabinets established in 1969
Cabinets disestablished in 1972
Willy Brandt